Joana Martins (born 4 October 2000) is a Portuguese professional footballer, who plays as a midfielder for Sporting CP and the Portugal national team.

Club career
Martins signed a professional contract with Sporting CP on 23 June 2017, at the age of 16. In the 2018–19 season, Martins played games for the youth, B and senior teams of Sporting. Towards the end of the season, however, she secured her place in the senior team and started in the final three league fixtures. On 24 June 2021, she signed a one-year contract extension with Sporting, committing herself to a sixth season with the club.

International career
Martins made her debut for the Portugal national team on 20 January 2019 against Ukraine.

References

2000 births
Living people
Women's association football midfielders
Portuguese women's footballers
Portugal women's international footballers
People from Sesimbra
Sporting CP (women's football) players
Campeonato Nacional de Futebol Feminino players
Sportspeople from Setúbal District